Squirewood Hall, later known as Hampton House, is a historic house in Dandridge, Tennessee, US.

History
The two-story house was completed in 1858. It was built with red bricks for Judge James Preston Swann (1819–1884). A Southern Unionist, Swann represented Jefferson County at the pro-Union East Tennessee Convention following the outbreak of the Civil War in 1861.  He served as a state circuit court judge in the years following the war.

Architectural significance
It has been listed on the National Register of Historic Places since July 16, 1973.

References

Houses completed in 1858
Houses in Jefferson County, Tennessee
Houses on the National Register of Historic Places in Tennessee
National Register of Historic Places in Jefferson County, Tennessee